MWI is the country code for Malawi in several country code systems.

MWI may also refer to:

Science and technology 
 Many-worlds interpretation, in quantum mechanics
 Message-waiting indicator, in telephony
 Mobile Web Initiative, in Mobile Web
 Maths Week Ireland, an all-island (Republic of Ireland and Northern Ireland) mathematics outreach initiative

Other uses 
 Ministry of Water and Irrigation, in Water supply and sanitation in Jordan
 Warsaw Modlin Airport (IATA: WMI)
 Mountain Warfare Instructor, in Mountain Warfare Training Center

See also
 MW-1